José Betancourt (born 8 January 1963 in Humacao, Puerto Rico) is a Puerto Rican former wrestler who competed in the 1984 Summer Olympics, in the 1992 Summer Olympics, and in the 1996 Summer Olympics.

Betancourt won a bronze medal at the 1987 Pan-American Games in the 74.0 kg. Greco-Roman category. At the 1987 Pan-American Games 74.0 kg. freestyle category he finished fourth. At the 1991 Pan-American Games: 82.0 kg. Greco-Roman category he finished fifth.

References

External links
 

1963 births
Living people
People from Humacao, Puerto Rico
Olympic wrestlers of Puerto Rico
Wrestlers at the 1984 Summer Olympics
Wrestlers at the 1988 Summer Olympics
Wrestlers at the 1992 Summer Olympics
Wrestlers at the 1996 Summer Olympics
Puerto Rican male sport wrestlers
American sportsmen
Pan American Games bronze medalists for Puerto Rico
Pan American Games medalists in wrestling
Wrestlers at the 1995 Pan American Games
Medalists at the 1995 Pan American Games